Howard Preston Ridlehuber (born November 2, 1943) is a former American collegiate and professional football running back in the National Football League (NFL) and the American Football League (AFL). He played one season each for the NFL's Atlanta Falcons and the AFL's Oakland Raiders and Buffalo Bills. He was drafted by the San Francisco 49ers in the 11th round, pick 166 overall, in the 1966 NFL draft and by the New York Jets in the 19th round, pick 168 overall, of the 1966 AFL draft.

Education

Ridlehuber is a graduate of Gainesville High School in Gainesville, Georgia where he was an all-around athlete in football, baseball, basketball and track. He received All-State honors as a baseball pitcher and football quarterback.  He then attended the University of Georgia where he played quarterback on the football team rather than sign as a pitcher with the Pittsburgh Pirates.  He won the C.M. Hendricks MVP award in the 1964 Sun Bowl where Georgia defeated Texas Tech. He was a member of Sigma Nu fraternity at Georgia.

Football career

Oakland Raiders
Ridlehuber is best known for scoring a touchdown with 33 seconds remaining in a game against the New York Jets, by recovering a fumbled kickoff.  It occurred in the Heidi Game, and was not seen by television viewers in most of the country because NBC switched from football coverage to the 1968 film Heidi. The Heidi Game or Heidi Bowl as it is also known led to a change in the way professional football is televised on network television; games are now shown to their conclusion before evening programming begins.

Buffalo Bills
His most notable Buffalo Bills highlight came during a game against the 0–5 then called Boston Patriots.  Preston was a backup running back with the 2–3 Bills.  O. J. Simpson had been concussed in Houston the week before and was not dressed for the Patriots game.  Fullback Wayne Patrick (number 30) had run 17 times for 131 yards.  Max Anderson (number 22) also known as Mini Max Anderson had 10 carries for 46 yards.  

Mini Max was injured during a collision on the field.  His face mask shattered and Anderson's teeth were broken and lying on the turf.  While medical personnel were administering to Max, Bill's coach John Rauch called for Preston along the sideline.  The score was tied 16–16 late in the 4th quarter.  Rauch knelt down and drew a play out in the dirt.  The play, a halfback option play, had been practiced for the last couple of weeks.  It was originally planned for O. J. to throw a short pass to the Tight end.  The Bills were in a short yardage situation, and this pass completion would keep the drive alive.

Preston took the play into the huddle and the play was set in motion.  On the snap, Ridlehuber who had been a quarterback at Georgia, noticed that the Patriots cornerback was closing in on the Tight end.  His better judgement told him to look elsewhere for an available receiver.  He then saw Bills wide receiver Haven Moses wide open. He tossed a pass to the open Moses and he scored a touchdown on the long 45-yard pass completion. 

When he returned to the bench, Coach Rauch congratulated him, and said:  'Be glad it worked.'  The play gave the Bills a 23–16 lead.  This touchdown stood up and was the final score. Notably, during that game, his regular jersey number (37) was ripped; as such, a replacement jersey with the number 31 was given to him to wear instead. The number 31 was retired for most of the team's history to represent a generic player and the "spirit of the franchise;" Ridlehuber would be the only player to wear the number for the Bills until it was unceremoniously put back into circulation in 1991.

Preston now is Honorary Commissioner of the Preston Ridlehuber Football League. This fantasy football league has been in existence since 1991 and is named as a tribute to a man who made great plays before and after his time with the Buffalo Bills. A career-ending injury prevented the world from enjoying Preston's contributions on the field.

See also

 Other American Football League players

References

Robert Marsh, Commissioner "Preston Ridelhuber Football League"

Online Athens article "Ridelhuber did Gainesville and Athens Proud"

1943 births
Living people
People from Greenwood, South Carolina
People from Gainesville, Georgia
Sportspeople from the Atlanta metropolitan area
Players of American football from Georgia (U.S. state)
Players of American football from South Carolina
American football running backs
Georgia Bulldogs football players
Atlanta Falcons players
Oakland Raiders players
Buffalo Bills players
American Football League players